The Bolshoi Ballet is a 1957 British musical film directed by Paul Czinner and starring Galina Ulanova, Raisa Struchkova, and Nikolai Fadeyechev. The film's composers, Yuri Fayer and Gennady Rozhdestvensky, were nominated for Best Original Score in the 31st Academy Awards (1958).

The film captures the 1956 performances of The Bolshoi Ballet in the United Kingdom at Davis Theatre, Croydon and at Covent Garden, performing divertissement and Giselle. The film was shot using multiple mobile, 35 mm Eastmancolor cameras.

Cast
Galina Ulanova as Giselle / Swan
Raisa Struchkova as Raissa Struchkova
Nikolai Fadeyechev

See also
List of British films of 1957

Bibliography 
Spain, Louise (1998). Dance on Camera: A Guide to Dance Films and Videos. Scarecrow Press.

References

External links
 
 
 

1957 films
American black-and-white films
American musical films
Films directed by Paul Czinner
1957 musical films
1950s English-language films
1950s American films